Golmaal is a 2003 Indian Telugu-language comedy film directed, produced and written by P. N. Ramachandra Rao and starring J. D. Chakravarthy, Ramesh Aravind, Meera Vasudevan and Neha Pendse. This film is a remake of the Malayalam film Malappuram Haji Mahanaya Joji (1994).

Cast 
J. D. Chakravarthy as Amir Khan 
Ramesh Aravind as Amar Sastry
Meera Vasudevan as Meenakshi
Neha as Mumtaz 
Jaya Prakash Reddy as Narahari
Giri Babu as Amir Khan's father

Production 
Meera Vasudevan, whose Hindi film was yet to release, debuted in Telugu cinema with this film.

Reception 
Gudipoodi Srihari of The Hindu opined that "this film too is quite entertaining with a sort of comedy of errors". Jeevi of Idlebrain.com said that "This film has nothing special to offer. At the same time, it is not boring. It's an average flick that provides good time pass". Manju Latha Kalanidhi of Full Hyderabad criticised the film and gave the film a rating of five out of ten.

References 

Telugu remakes of Malayalam films